Bezrechny is a rural locality (a khutor) in Grishinskoye Rural Settlement, Kikvidzensky District, Volgograd Oblast, Russia. The population was 81 as of 2010. There are 2 streets.

Geography 
Bezrechny is located 19 km southeast of Preobrazhenskaya (the district's administrative centre) by road. Grishin is the nearest rural locality.

References 

Rural localities in Kikvidzensky District